The 2020 All-Ireland Senior Camogie Championship – known as the Liberty Insurance Camogie Championship for sponsorship reasons – is the premier inter-county competition of the 2020 camogie season.

The winners receive the O'Duffy Cup. Due to the impact of the COVID-19 pandemic on Gaelic games, the tournament was delayed to the last months of the year, and was shortened to a season of twenty matches.

Instead original fixtures will be rescheduled for 2021 championships.

Teams

Eleven county teams compete in the Senior Championship. 20 lower-ranked county teams compete in the Intermediate and Junior Championships.

Format

Group Stage

The eleven teams are drawn into three groups. Groups 1 and 2 contain four teams; Group 3 contains three teams. Each team plays each other team in its group once. Three points are awarded for a win and one for a draw.

Knock-out stage

The runners-up in groups 1, 2 and 3 and the winners of Group 3 play in the quarter-finals.

The winners of groups 1 and 2 meet the quarter-final winners in the semi-finals.

Group stage
Group games took place between 17 October and 8 November.

Group 1

Cork received a walkover from Offaly

Group 2

Group 3

Knockout stage

Quarter-finals

Semi-finals

Final

References

External links
 Camogie Association

2020 in camogie
2020
Ladies' All-Ireland Championship